Kenneth Wells is a New Hampshire politician.

Career
On November 6, 2018, Wells was elected to the New Hampshire House of Representatives where he represented the Merrimack 1 district. Wells assumed office on December 5, 2018. Wells is a Democrat.

Personal life
Wells resides in Andover, New Hampshire. Wells is married and has two children.

References

Living people
People from Andover, New Hampshire
Democratic Party members of the New Hampshire House of Representatives
21st-century American politicians
Year of birth missing (living people)